Foley Beach Express (FBE) is a  limited-access four-lane partial toll road near the beaches of Baldwin County near the Gulf of Mexico in the southwestern part of the U.S. state of Alabama. It serves as an alternate route for the heavily traveled State Route 59 (SR 59) in nearby Gulf Shores. The southern terminus of the highway is at an intersection with SR 180 in the northwestern part of Orange Beach. The northern terminus of the highway is at an intersection with SR 59 in the far north part of Foley. The extreme southern portion of the highway is part of Alabama's Coastal Connection, a National Scenic Byway.

The toll bridge on the FBE is a comparably quicker connection with the Alabama mainland. It shaves off miles and minutes from crossing the Gulf Intracoastal Waterway at SR 59 in Gulf Shores. The bridge was owned by American Roads and was in danger of bankruptcy in 2013, due to American Roads' $830 million debt from the FBE and other toll roads it owned. Syncora Guarantee eventually became the new owner.

Route description
The FBE begins at an intersection with SR 180 (Canal Road) in the northwestern part of Orange Beach. It travels to the north-northwest and curves to the northwest. It crosses over Portage Creek and the Gulf Intracoastal Waterway on an unnamed toll bridge. This bridge also crosses over County Route 4 (CR 4; Brown Lane). Just after the bridge ends, the highway has a tollbooth. Immediately after the tollbooth is an intersection with the eastern terminus of CR 4. The highway curves to a nearly due north direction and crosses over an unnamed branch of Portage Creek. It then leaves the city limits of Orange Beach. The FBE then curves to the west before a crossing of Cotton Creek. Upon crossing the creek, it curves to the north-northwest. It has an intersection with CR 8, which is only accessible from the southbound lanes of the FBE. It passes the campus of Columbia Southern University. At an intersection with CR 12, the highway enters Foley. Approximately  later is an intersection with CR 20 (Miflin Road). Here, the Alabama's Coastal Connection designation turns to the east, while the FBE continues to the north. It curves to the northeast and crosses over Wolf Creek before curving back to the north. It then intersects U.S. Route 98 (US 98). Then, the highway curves to the west and has an intersection with the northern terminus of CR 28 and the southern terminus of the Baldwin Beach Express (BBE). It has an intersection with CR 73 just before reaching its northern terminus, an intersection with SR 59.

History

The FBE was built in two sections: the toll-free Foley Bypass and the toll bridge and its approach road. The cost of the highway was $44 million. It was funded by a $36 million private taxable toll revenue bond issue, with additional grants from the Federal Highway Administration and the City of Foley.

It opened to traffic in June 2000.

On July 8, 2015, two barges hit the safety fender of the toll bridge at about 2:15 am. Approximately  of the fender was removed. The bridge was inspected at about 11:00 am, while police and fire boats helped to maintain the area while divers were underwater.  The bridge was reopened to traffic at about 1:30 pm.

Major intersections

See also

References

External links

 
 Foley Beach Express / Baldwin Beach Express on AARoads.com

Transportation in Baldwin County, Alabama
Toll roads in Alabama